"Love Will Destroy Us in the End" is a single by British indie rock band Hefner.  It was released by Too Pure in 1998, and is the first proper single from their album Breaking God's Heart.

The b-side "Goethe's Letter to Vic Chesnutt" was not written by typical Hefner songwriter Darren Hayman, but, according to Hayman, a "guy called Mathew who I no longer keep contact with. He was in this band called the New Bad Things who are most famous for a song called 'I suck' which [John] Peel played every night for about four years."

Track listing
The single was released on compact disc and a 7" vinyl record.  The compact disc version contains all four tracks, while the 7" only contains the first two.

 "Love Will Destroy Us in the End"
 "Destroyed Cowboy Falls"
 "Blind Girl with Halo"
 "Goethe's Letter to Vic Chesnutt"

References

External links
https://web.archive.org/web/20120415034301/http://www.hefnet.com/love%20will.htm

Hefner (band) songs
1998 songs
Too Pure singles